Championship Manager: Season 01/02 is a football management video game in Sports Interactive's Championship Manager series. It was released for Microsoft Windows in October 2001, and for Mac in November 2001. It was later released on Xbox in April 2002. It was released as freeware in 2008. The game allowed players to take charge of any club in one of around 100 leagues across 27 countries, with responsibility for tactics and signings. The game sold more than 300,000 copies in the United Kingdom and is still popular and regularly updated.

New features 
Although never particularly expanding on the graphical side, Sports Interactive included many new features along with the usual updated database. Championship Manager 01/02 implemented the new EU regulated transfer system, introduced in September 2001, and also featured a new "attribute masking" mode, whereby the player could only see information about footballers they would realistically know about (also known as a fog of war).

Other new additions included the ability to send players away for surgery, player notes, player comparisons, and improved media and board interaction.

The champman0102.net community has provided various patches and data updates to the game and continues to do so to this day. The ability to change game values, commentary speed, utilize coloured attributes, change the start year and many other changes have been made. The community has over 13,000 accounts and counting, and "Keeps the Game Alive".

Playable leagues 
This edition of Championship Manager included about 100 fully playable leagues in 26 countries, and patch 3.9.67 added South Korea's K-League, its first appearance in the CM series.

Asia

Europe

North America

Oceania

South America

Free release and data updates
In December 2008, Eidos Interactive made the game available for free download.

Release
In 2001, presenters Ant & Dec, who hosted the Saturday morning show SMTV Live, left the show. On their last show, they received a letter (from Sports Interactive) and special edition copies of Championship Manager: Season 01/02 which saw Ant as a player for Newcastle with a contract of £50,000 a week with a value of £4.7m, and Dec as a player for Sunderland with a contract of £90 a week.

Fictional players
The first release of the game included a player named "Tó Madeira", a great striker no matter where he played. It was later revealed that Tó Madeira was not a real footballer, but in fact a fictional player created by a scout working for the game producers.

Reception
The computer version of Championship Manager: Season 01/02 received a "Platinum" sales award from the Entertainment and Leisure Software Publishers Association (ELSPA), indicating sales of at least 300,000 copies in the United Kingdom.

The dedicated CM0102 Forum still continues to create data updates and the most recent, which was also released in November 2020 was released in conjunction with a new server move for the champman0102 website and has proved extremely popular as always and looks forward to celebrating the game’s 20th anniversary later in 2021, with a number of things planned to mark the occasion.

References

External links
CM History: Championship Manager 01/02

2001 video games
Eidos Interactive games
Freeware games
Classic Mac OS games
Multiplayer hotseat games
Windows games
Xbox games
Association football management video games
Video games developed in the United Kingdom